Hugh Albert Harris (2 August 1964 – 1 January 2019) was an English musician, most known for his song "Rhythm of Life".

Career
Hugh Harris was born in London in 1964. He released his first album, Words for Our Years in 1989, that featured his only hit "Rhythm of Life"; it was featured in the film Uncle Buck. In July 1990, "Rhythm of Life" peaked at No. 92 in the UK Singles Chart. His first album garnered critical acclaim, and Harris' style was compared to Prince, Terence Trent D'arby and female vocalist Tracy Chapman.

In the late 1980s and early 1990s, Harris was in a low-key relationship with Sinéad O'Connor. His song "Seven Days" was on the soundtrack for Kalifornia, and was subsequently included on his 2002 album Flowers.

Illness caused Harris to disappear from the music scene soon after his success, thus stalling what could be regarded as a promising musical career.

Harris emerged from a 12-year hiatus, in 2002, to release, Flowers, an album originally recorded in 1992 before an illness forced him to retreat from music. He has worked with Ice-T, Wendy Melvoin (of Wendy & Lisa), Amp Fiddler, record producers Gary Katz and David Z, and Planet Funk.

In September 2013, two albums were released via iTunes. These albums, titled The Captain's Tales Vol 1 & 2, were released on his own label 'Not Them Again Music', and brought to an end an 11-year musical hiatus.

Hugh Harris died on 1 January 2019.

Album discography
1989: Words for Our Years - Capitol Records
2002: Flowers (recorded in 1992) - Airwave
2013: The Captain's Tale, Vol. 1 - Not Them Again Music
2013: The Captain's Tale, Vol. 2 - Not Them Again Music

References

External links
AOL Music
Artistdirect.com
Spotify 
Review, The New York Times

1964 births
2019 deaths
English male singers
English pianists
English songwriters
British male pianists
21st-century pianists
21st-century British male musicians
British male songwriters